Minuscule 757 (in the Gregory-Aland numbering), δ304 (von Soden), is a Greek minuscule manuscript of the New Testament written on paper. Palaeographically it has been assigned to the 13th century. The manuscript has no complex contents. Scrivener labelled it as 846e, 209a, 399p, and 146r.

Description 
The codex contains the text of the New Testament, on 414 paper leaves (size ), with some lacunae. The texts of Matthew 1:1-2:11; 27:60-28:14; John 4:31-21:25 were supplied in the 16th century. The text of Matthew 15:20-23:27 is very defective. It has not Ephesians 4:28-6:24.

The text is written in one column per page, 24-28 lines per page.

Synaxarion and Menologion were added in the 16th century.

The order of books: Gospels, Acts, Catholic epistles, Pauline epistles (Hebrews follows Philemon), Apocalypse.

Text 
The Greek text of the codex is a representative of the Byzantine text-type. Hermann von Soden classified it to the textual family Kr. Aland placed it in Category V.

According to the Claremont Profile Method it represents textual family Kr in Luke 1 and Luke 20. In Luke 10 no profile was made. It creates textual pair with 1075.

The text of the Pericope Adulterae is marked by an obelus.

History 
Scrivener dated the manuscript to the 15th century; Gregory dated the manuscript to the 13th or 14th century. The manuscript is currently dated by the INTF to the 13th century.

In 1843 it was brought from the monastery in Locris.

It was added to the list of New Testament manuscripts by Scrivener (846) and Gregory (757). Gregory saw the manuscript in 1886. The text of the Apocalypse was collated by Herman C. Hoskier.

The manuscript is now housed at the National Library of Greece (150) in Athens.

See also 

 List of New Testament minuscules
 Biblical manuscript
 Textual criticism
 Minuscule 758

References

Further reading 

 
 Hoskier, Concerning the Text of the Apocalypse: Collation of All Existing Available Greek Documents with the Standard Text of Stephen’s Third Edition Together with the Testimony of Versions, Commentaries and Fathers. 1 vol. (London: Bernard Quaritch, Ltd., 1929), pp. 513–514 (only for Apocalypse)

Greek New Testament minuscules
13th-century biblical manuscripts
Manuscripts of the National Library of Greece